Epica is an album by American group Audiomachine, released on 10 July 2012. The album peaked at number five on the Billboard Top Classical Albums chart.

Track listing

Charts

References

External links 
 
 

2012 albums
Audiomachine albums